Spare Room may refer to:

 The Spare Room
 The Spare Room (film)
 Spare Room Restaurant and Lounge, Portland, Oregon, U.S.